This is a list of West Indian women's One-day international cricketers. Overall, 95 West Indian women have played in at least one women's one-day international. A One Day International (ODI) is an international cricket match between two representative teams, each having ODI status. An ODI differs from Test matches in that the number of overs per team is limited, and that each team has only one innings. The list is arranged in the order in which each player won her first ODI cap. Where more than one player won her first ODI cap in the same match, those players are listed alphabetically by surname.

Key

List of Players
Statistics are correct as of 9 December 2022. Note that the list of players by West Indies cap number on Cricinfo also includes players who only played ODI matches for either Trinidad and Tobago or Jamaica (during the 1973 Women's Cricket World Cup where these nations competed separately instead of a West Indies side) and did not ever play for the West Indies.

Notes:
1 These players also played ODI cricket for Trinidad and Tobago. Only their records for the West Indies are shown above. See List of Trinidad and Tobago women ODI cricketers for their records for Trinidad and Tobago.
2 These players also played ODI cricket for Jamaica. Only their records for the West Indies are shown above. See List of Jamaica women ODI cricketers for their records for Jamaica.

See also
West Indian women's cricket team
List of West Indian women's Test cricketers
List of West Indian men's ODI cricketers

References

External links
CricketWoman

West Indies women One Day International cricketers
West Indian women test
Women ODI